Gor Sujyan (born 25 July 1987) is an Armenian rock singer and lead singer of the Armenian rock band Dorians. He represented Armenia in the Eurovision Song Contest 2013 in Malmö, Sweden, with the song Lonely Planet.

Biography

Early life 
Gor Sujyan was born on 25 July 1987 in Yerevan, Armenia. He is the son of guitarist, jazzman Mkrtich Sujyan.

Dorians 
At the age of 17, Gor has created band "Gor & Friends". It has been performing cover-version of popular rock songs. Since June 2008 – lead singer and main composer of a new rock band Dorians. In April 2009 Dorians won the "Best Newcomer" award at the annual Tashir Music Awards in Moscow.

On 22 December 2011, the band presented their first album named "Fly".

Eurovision 
At the Eurovision Song Contest 2010, Gor was one of the back-up singers for Eva Rivas during her performance of "Apricot Stone."

On 21 January 2013, it was announced by ARMTV, that Gor would represent Armenia at the Eurovision Song Contest 2013, to be held in Malmö, Sweden. He will sing the song "Lonely Planet", written by legendary Tony Iommi, the English guitarist and songwriter, a founder member of the pioneering heavy metal band Black Sabbath and Armenian lyricist Vardan Zadoyan. On 16 May, "Lonely Planet" competed in the second semi-final, and qualified to the finals, placing 7th in a field of 17 songs and scoring 69 points (they received 12 points from France).  In the final, the song placed 18th with 41 points.

Awards 

2009 – Best Newcomer (Dorians) WON
2010 – Best Male Singer (Gor Sujyan) WON
2010 – Best Rock Band of the Year (Dorians) WON
2011 – Best Rock Band of the Year (Dorians) WON
2011 – Best Video of the Year (Dorians) WON
2011 – Best Vocal of the Year (Gor Sujyan) WON
2011 – Rock Number One (Dorians) WON
2011 – Man Number One (Gor Sujyan) WON

Television

References

Eurovision Song Contest entrants of 2013
Eurovision Song Contest entrants for Armenia
Armenian rock musicians
1987 births
Living people
21st-century Armenian singers